Streptocionella singularis is a species of minute sea snail, a marine gastropod mollusk in the family Pyramidellidae, the pyrams and their allies.

Description
The length of the shell measures 3.8 mm.

Distribution
This marine species occurs off the South Georgia Islands in the southern Atlantic Ocean.

References

External links

Pyramidellidae
Gastropods described in 1886